Luis Aguayo Muriel (born March 13, 1959) is a Puerto Rican former professional baseball infielder and coach, who played in Major League Baseball (MLB) for the Philadelphia Phillies, New York Yankees, and 
Cleveland Indians.

Playing career
Aguayo was signed by the Philadelphia Phillies as an amateur free agent on December 27, 1975, at the age of 16. He made his big league debut for the Phillies on April 19, 1980, in a win over the Expos.  He entered the game in the top of 3rd inning as a pinch runner for Manny Trillo, and would play second base for the remainder of the game.  Although Aguayo would play with the Phillies until 1988, he only appeared in two games in the 1981 postseason, acting as a pinch runner in the series against the Dodgers.  According to some metrics, Aguayo ranked 76th in the National League according to statistics in 1985.

Aguayo was traded to the New York Yankees in the middle of July 1988 for minor leaguer Amalio Carreño, and would sign with the Cleveland Indians after the season. Aguayo only appeared in 47 games for the Indians before being released after the 1989 season, and would linger in the minor leagues until 1992, batting .255 in 80 games for the Pawtucket Red Sox.

Post-playing career
After his playing career was over, Aguayo managed the Red Sox Class A Lowell Spinners from 1999 to 2000.

On June 17, 2008, Aguayo was named the New York Mets third base coach. On October 23 of that season, the Mets announced that Aguayo would be reassigned within the organization and that Razor Shines would be replacing him as third base coach.  Aguayo is currently the international field coordinator/infield instructor for the minor league staff of the St. Louis Cardinals.

See also
 List of Major League Baseball players from Puerto Rico

References

External links

Luis Aguayo at SABR (Baseball BioProject)

 

 Let go from Mets organization in November 2009.

1959 births
Living people
Auburn Phillies players
Billings Mustangs managers
Cleveland Indians players
Edmonton Trappers players
Lowell Spinners managers
Major League Baseball infielders
Major League Baseball players from Puerto Rico
Major League Baseball third base coaches
Midland Angels players
New York Mets coaches
New York Yankees players
Oklahoma City 89ers players
Pawtucket Red Sox players
People from Vega Baja, Puerto Rico
Philadelphia Phillies players
Portland Beavers players
Puerto Rican expatriate baseball players in Canada
Reading Phillies players
Spartanburg Phillies players